James or Jim Kerr may refer to:

Sport

Association football
 James Kerr (football manager) (died 1933), English football manager
 James Kerr (footballer, born 1894), Scottish football wing half
 Jim Kerr (footballer, born 1942) (1942–2008), Scottish footballer
 Jim Kerr (footballer, born 1959), Scottish footballer
 Jimmy Kerr (footballer, born 1919) (1919–2001), Scottish footballer (Hibernian FC)
 Jimmy Kerr (footballer, born 1949), Scottish footballer (Bury FC)

Other sports
 Jamie Kerr (born 1975), Scottish cricketer
 James Reid Kerr (1883–1963), Scottish rugby player
 Jimmy Kerr (1910–1998), Scottish rugby player
 James Kerr (fencer) (born 1940), Olympic fencer for the United States Virgin Islands
 Jim Kerr (American football) (born 1939), American football player

Politicians
 James Kerr (New Zealand politician) (1834–1901), member of the New Zealand Legislative Council
 James Kerr (Pennsylvania politician) (1851–1908), American politician, U.S. congressman and Clerk of U.S. House of Representatives
 James Kerr (Texas politician) (1790–1850), American soldier and statesman who was prominent in the Republic of Texas
 James Hutchison Kerr (1837–1919), American educator, engineer, and politician from Colorado
 James Kirkpatrick Kerr (1841–1916), Canadian lawyer and senator
 James Stevingstone Kerr (1889–1960), member of the Queensland Legislative Assembly

Other
 James Kerr, Scottish engineer and co-founder of locomotive builders Kerr Stuart
 Jim Kerr, a radio host for WAXQ-FM Q104.3 New York
 James Lennox Kerr (1899–1963), British author
 Jim Kerr (born 1959), Scottish musician with the group Simple Minds
 James S. Kerr, Scottish music publisher 
 James Semple Kerr (1932–2014), Australian architectural historian and conservation practitioner
 James Taggart Kerr, U.S. Army general